Balagach-Kul (Balağaskül) is a rural locality (a village) in Kakrybashevsky Selsoviet, Tuymazinsky District, Bashkortostan, Russia. The population was 48 as of 2010. There are 2 streets.

Geography 
Balagach-Kul is located 15 km north of Tuymazy (the district's administrative centre) by road. Ardatovka is the nearest rural locality.

References 

Rural localities in Tuymazinsky District